Vawn is a former village, now a hamlet, in the Canadian province of Saskatchewan. It was dissolved as a village in 2004; its population is now counted as part of the rural municipality of Turtle River. Vawn is located on Highway 26 52 km north west of the City of North Battleford.

History 
Prior to February 15, 2004, Vawn was incorporated as a village, and was restructured as a hamlet under the jurisdiction of the Rural municipality of Turtle River on that date.

Demographics 

See also 

 List of communities in Saskatchewan
 Hamlets of Saskatchewan

References

Designated places in Saskatchewan
Former villages in Saskatchewan
Turtle River No. 469, Saskatchewan
Populated places disestablished in 2004
Division No. 17, Saskatchewan